Bones Apart is an English all-female trombone quartet. The group formed in 1999 at the Royal Northern College of Music in Manchester. As of 2019, the group includes Becky Smith, Sarah Williams, Jayne Murrill, and Helen Vollam. Former members include Carol Jarvis, Becca Harper, Lorna McDonald, Camilla Tveit and Arlene Macfarlane.

Tours and performances
The quartet has toured throughout Europe, Japan and in the United States including performances at the International Trombone Festival, the International Women's Brass Conference, the Spanish Brass Festival, and the Edinburgh International Festival, Scandinavian Trombone Festival, Lieksa Brass Week, Vilnius Festival, Bury St Edmunds Festival, Leicester International Music Festival, Sauerland-Herbst Festival, Eastern Trombone Workshop in Washington, DC.

Awards
The group won the 2001 Royal Over-Seas League Competition and has also won the Philip Jones Award.

Discography
Bones Apart has released four albums.
No More Blues (2002)
Enigma (2006)
four4four (2009)
ten (2009) - 10th anniversary CD

References

External links
BonesApart.com

All-female bands
British instrumental musical groups
English trombonists
Women trombonists